Nafi's Father is a 2019 Senegalese drama film directed by Mamadou Dia. It was selected as the Senegalese entry for the Best International Feature Film at the 93rd Academy Awards, but it was not nominated.

Cast
 Saikou Lo as Ousmane
 Alassane Sy as Tierno
 Penda Daly Sy as Rakia

See also
 List of submissions to the 93rd Academy Awards for Best International Feature Film
 List of Senegalese submissions for the Academy Award for Best International Feature Film

References

External links
 

2019 films
2019 drama films
Senegalese drama films